The 2016 Argentine Primera División - Copa Axion Energy  was the 126th season of top-flight professional football in Argentina. The season began on February 5 and ended on May 29. Thirty teams competed in the league, twenty eight returning from the 2015 and two promoted from the 2015 Primera B Nacional (Atlético Tucumán and Patronato). Two teams (Nueva Chicago and Crucero del Norte) were relegated to the Primera B Nacional Championship in the previous tournament.

Lanús won their second title after defeating San Lorenzo 4–0 in the final.

Competition format 
The tournament for the 2016 season was composed of two zones of 15 teams. Each team played the other 14 teams in its zone in a round-robin tournament and also played two interzonal matches against its rival team in the other zone, once home and once away. In the end, the winner of each played a final match on a neutral ground to determine the champion.

Club information

Stadia and locations

Personnel

Managerial changes 

Interim Managers
1.  Juan Pablo Vojvoda was interim manager in the 3rd and 4th rounds.
2. Interim manager, but later promoted to manager until the end of the tournament.
3.  Andrés Yllana was interim manager in the 8th round.
4.  Fabián Castro was interim manager in the 8th round.
5. Interim manager in the 12th–16th rounds.
6. Interim manager in the 14th–16th rounds.
7. Interim manager in the 15th and 16th rounds.

League table

Zone 1

Zone 2

Final

Match details

Results

Copa Libertadores playoff

The second-place team in each zone qualified to the 2017 Copa Libertadores and played a match at a neutral stadium to determine at which stage each team entered. The winner of this playoff qualified directly to the second stage (earning the Argentina 3 berth), and the loser entered the first stage of the tournament (earning the Argentina 4 berth).

Several months after the playoff, CONMEBOL expanded the 2017 Copa Libertadores from 38 to 47 teams with Argentina gaining one additional berth. So, Godoy Cruz also qualified directly to the second stage and AFA had to choose between the third places in each zone, Atlético Tucumán and Independiente, to determine the team qualified as Argentine 6 berth. Finally, AFA gave the extra berth to Atlético Tucumán by sporting criteria.

Season statistics

Top Goalscorers

Top Assists

Source: AFA

Relegation
Relegation at the end of the season is based on the points per game obtained by the clubs during the present season and the three previous seasons (only seasons in the Primera are counted). The team with the worst average at the end of the season is relegated to Primera B Nacional.

See also
2015–16 Copa Argentina
2016 Primera B Nacional

References

External links
Fixtures:
 Zone 1
 Zone 2
soccerway.com

Argentine Primera División seasons
p
p